Otto Freiherr von Brandenstein (21 October 1865 – 8 May 1945) was a German officer. He joined the Prussian Army in 1885 and was promoted to oberstleutnant in 1913. During World War I, Brandenstein served in the Western Front as a staff officer under the command of the generals Gustav Freiherr von Hollen and Eberhard von Claer.

In 1918, colonel Brandenstein was the commander of the formed cavalry brigade Detachment Brandenstein which landed in Loviisa, Finland in 3 April. The brigade joined the Finnish Civil War and fought with the Finnish Whites. After the Battle of Lahti, the unit was attached to the Baltic Sea Division.

Otto von Brandenstein was awarded the Pour le Mérite on 15 May 1918 and promoted to Major General on 18 October 1918. He resigned from the German Army in February 1919. Brandenstein was murdered by Soviet troops in May 1945.

References 

1945 deaths
Major generals of Prussia
German Army generals of World War I
People of the Finnish Civil War (White side)
Recipients of the Pour le Mérite (military class)
1865 births
German people executed by the Soviet Union
German civilians killed in World War II
German expatriates in Finland